Old Norman, also called Old Northern French or Old Norman French, was one of many varieties of the langues d'oïl native to northern France. It was spoken throughout the region of what is now called Normandy and spread into England, Southern Italy, Sicily and the Levant.  It is the ancestor of modern Norman, including the insular dialects (such as Jèrriais), as well as Anglo-Norman.
Old Norman was an important language of the Principality of Antioch during Crusader rule in the Levant.

Old Norman contained Old Norse loanwords unknown in other Old French dialects at that time. 

Writings of the Jersey-born poet Wace are among the few records of Old Norman that remain.

References

Norman, Old
Norman, Old
Languages of Sicily